Mati Vaikjärv (born 2 February 1944) is an Estonian archer. He competed in the men's individual event at the 1972 Summer Olympics.

References

External links
 

1944 births
Living people
Estonian male archers
Olympic archers of the Soviet Union
Archers at the 1972 Summer Olympics
People from Tõstamaa
20th-century Estonian people